Fruitlands may refer to several places:
Fruitlands (transcendental center), American historic landmark; short-lived Massachusetts utopian community founded in June 1843 by Bronson Alcott and Charles Lane
Fruitlands Museum, American museum on site of transcendental center; in 1997 Fruitlands Museums Historic District was added to National Register of Historic Places
Fruitlands (Augusta National Golf Club), American historic domestic single dwelling added in 1979 to National Register of Historic Places listings in Richmond County, Georgia (listing 19)
Fruitlands, New Zealand, 19th century gold mining settlement in the Central Otago district of the South Island; picturesque tourist area which takes its name from unsuccessful 1920s orchards